Nerur is a town of Kudal Taluka of Sindhudurg district (Sindhudurga in native Malvani language) of Maharashtra in India. It is one of the smaller towns in the district having 32 wadis. The Malvani dialect of Konkani is spoken here. Nerur is becoming an attraction amongst Indian and foreign tourists from Mumbai and Goa.

Etymology 
The name Nerur said to be derived from conjunction of two Dravidian words Neer (means Water) and Oor (Means village in Dravidian languages) literally means "Village of Waters", some suggested that it could be from Nera (Time in Tamil) and Oor, but proximity of this place with Kannada speaking region suggests the former is more suitable.

Geography 

Vasundhara Science Center 
Founded in 1995 as public charitable trust, situated on Kudal-Malvan Road near Nerurpar. This was founded by Mr. C. B. Naik an ex-Bank of India officer. Mission of this foundation is to provide scientific knowledge in remote villages. Vasundhara has organized "Science on Wheels"  to reach aspiring students of remote villages in Maharashtra. Nearly 1200 students from 90 villages have benefited from this initiative.

Nerurpar 
Nerurpar is the westernmost part of Nerur village, it is situated on the banks of Karli river and famous for its scenery and backwaters.

Temples

There are many temples in the town. Some of them are :
Shree Kaleshwara Mandira, 
Shri Gawadoba 
Bhootnath Ravalnath. 
Shree Kothari Brahmana Mandira
The temple of Shree Deva Kaleshwara is also located in the area. During  Shivaratri, a big jatra is held.

Culture
Nerur is known for its Dashavatara play. The Dashavatara artist Mahadev Ramachandra (aka Babi Kalingan) was born in this village and he made Dashavatara Natya as one of the famous art form in Konkan. In 1994 he was honored by Akhil Bharatiya Marathi Natya Parishad for his contribution in Dashavatara Natya.
Khele (खेळे in Malvani) is one of the famous art which takes place in Shimgotsava (or Holi) every year.

Communities
The most common surnames of the people in the village include Naik, Nerurkar, Gawade, Raut, Rege, Parab, Fernandes and Prabhu. Chavhata, Jakat Naka and Nerurpar river areas are well populated.

Distance 
Nerur is just 6 km away from Kudal railway station, 9 km away from Mumbai Goa highway. The domestic Chipi airport is 14 km away and it is one hour 20 minutes drive away from Calangute Beach Goa. 

Nerur is a famous place in kudal, maharashtra

References

Cities and towns in Sindhudurg district